Pedro Jesús López Baquero (born 2 October 1980 in Huelva, Andalusia) is a Spanish retired footballer who played as a central defender.

Club statistics

Honours
Recreativo
Segunda División: 2005–06

Rayo Vallecano
Segunda División B: 2007–08

Cádiz
Segunda División B: 2011–12

References

External links

1980 births
Living people
Spanish footballers
Footballers from Huelva
Association football defenders
Segunda División players
Segunda División B players
Tercera División players
Atlético Onubense players
Gimnàstic de Tarragona footballers
Recreativo de Huelva players
Rayo Vallecano players
Lorca Deportiva CF footballers
Pontevedra CF footballers
Cádiz CF players
Real Oviedo players
Lleida Esportiu footballers
CD San Roque de Lepe footballers
Cypriot First Division players
Doxa Katokopias FC players
Spanish expatriate footballers
Expatriate footballers in Cyprus
Spanish expatriate sportspeople in Cyprus